Shamos is a surname. Notable people with the surname include:

Michael Ian Shamos (born 1947), American mathematician
Jeremy Shamos (born 1970), American actor

See also
Shames (surname)